Nahlin may refer to:

 the Nahlin River in far northwestern British Columbia, Canada
 Nahlin Mountain, a mountain on the north side of the Nahlin River in far northwestern British Columbia, Canada
 Nahlin Plateau in northwestern British Columbia, Canada
 Peter Nahlin, a former Swedish speedway rider
 Nahlin, a luxury yacht owned by Sir James Dyson